Ramsay Midwood is an Austin, Texas-based singer and songwriter. His voice has been likened to Woody Guthrie, Johnny Cash, John Prine, and Bruce Springsteen, his lyrical imagery to Tom Waits, and his raw blues music to John Lee Hooker.

Biography 

Midwood born in Woodstock, New York and raised in Arlington, Virginia, a suburb of Washington, D.C. His father, novelist Bart Midwood who also wrote for Esquire, and his mother, painter Susan Kellogg, encouraged his musical interests.

After graduating from James Madison University in 1987, Midwood moved to Chicago and acted as an understudy with the Steppenwolf Theater Company in a production of The Grapes of Wrath, playing both Al Joad and Floyd Knowles.

Midwood moved to Los Angeles, where he met guitarist Randy Weeks (Lonesome Strangers) who would co-produce Midwood's first album. Midwood and Weeks started the band Wayfarer.

In 2002, Midwood recorded his debut album Shoot Out at the OK Chinese Restaurant for the German label Glitterhouse Records who initially released it Germany. Guest artists included Randy Weeks (guitar, banjo, harmonica, drums), Josh Grange (guitar), Brantley Kearns (fiddle), Skip Edwards (accordion, piano, organ), Rami Jaffe (accordion, organ), Matt Margucci (trumpet), Donny McGough (piano, organ), Kip Boardman (piano, bass), Sheldon Gomberg (bass), Don Heffington, Kevin Jarvis, and Nelson Bragg (drums).

The album was released in the United States with a slightly different set of songs in November 2002 by Vanguard Records. By then, Midwood had moved to Austin after his Los Angeles home burned down, and began playing at venues such as The Saxon Pub, Sam’s Town Point and The White Horse.

Midwood released Popular Delusions and the Madness of Cows on his own label Farmwire Music label in 2006. Don Heffington produced and played drums. Others helping out included David Jackson (bass), Kip Boardman (bass, piano), David Vaught (bass), Randy Weeks (guitar, banjo), Jake Labotz (guitar), Greg Leisz (lap steel guitar, mandolin), Danny McGough (organ), Phil Parlapiano (organ, accordion), and Jon Birdsong (tuba).

In 2011, Midwood released Larry Buys a Lighter, self-released on Farmwire and produced by Midwood and Weeks. Other musicians were Radoslav Lorković (accordion), Joey Thompson (bass, piano), Mark Hays (drums), Seth Gibbs (drums, bass), Wayne Chojo Jacques (fiddle), Kevin Russell (mandolin), Tony Scalzo (organ), and Justin Sherburn (organ, piano).

Discography

Solo albums
 2000: Shoot Out at the OK Chinese Restaurant (Glitterhouse) released in the U.S. by Vanguard) in 2002.
 2006: Popular Delusions & The Madness of Cows (Farmwire)
 2011, "Larry Buys a Lighter (Farmwire)

Also appears on
 2000: Randy Weeks - Madeline (Hightone)
 2007: The Gourds - Noble Creatures (Yep Roc)
 2012: Tex Smith - A Wayfarer's Lament (self-released)
 2015: various artists - Cold and Bitter Tears: The Songs of Ted Hawkins'' (Eight 30) - track 11, "My Last Goodbye"

References

External links 
 
 

Living people
American singer-songwriters
Year of birth missing (living people)
American male singer-songwriters